The Cameron Highlands forest skink (Sphenomorphus cameronicus)  is a species of skink found in Malaysia.

References

cameronicus
Reptiles described in 1924
Taxa named by Malcolm Arthur Smith
Reptiles of the Malay Peninsula